is a Japanese anime television series produced by Hoods Entertainment and directed by Hisashi Saitō. Gorō Taniguchi serves as the creative producer, while the series composition is handled by Noboru Kimura and Yūko Kakihara. The series aired in Japan between July 7 and September 28, 2013. Three manga adaptations are published by Kadokawa Shoten and Media Factory.

Plot
Uzume Uno, a girl who used to be an elite player at card tournaments, is one day given a curious device which uses special cards to summon artificially intelligent female warriors known as Fantasista Dolls.

Characters

Card club

 A 14-year-old junior high school student, and the master of five Fantasista Dolls. She is an elite card player who won a card tournament prior to the beginning of the series. At first she was seriously troubled being responsible for five Dolls all of a sudden, although she eventually develops bonds with them and does not hesitate to fight alongside her Dolls in battles.

 Uzume's underclassman and rival. She is the first opponent Uzume faces after she becomes a Doll Master. She joined the Mutual Dream Association Group in order to search for information on her older brother, who went missing several years ago. However, she eventually comes to believe in Uzume's friendship.

 The president of the card club and Uzume's childhood friend who has dubiously named it the 'Masquerade Curry Upbeat'. She is also a Doll Master.

Uzume's Dolls

 The first Fantasista Doll that Uzume meets. Her color is yellow and she is a strong swordsman who often argues with Uzume a lot due to her stubbornness.

A small, blue-haired Fantasista Doll who has unconscious luck. She is childish and careless. She becomes friends with Uzume's younger sister, Miko, and eventually hangs out with her when the opportunity rises.

A pink-haired Fantasista Doll. Having been abandoned by her last master, she is very sensitive and fragile. She initially does not believe much in Uzume, thinking that she will abandon them again. However, she is relieved when Uzume makes a promise that she will never do that.

A gothic lolita-wearing Fantasista Doll who attacks using yo-yos. She is expressionless and naive.

A tall busty Fantasista Doll who is always ready to help out her master. She also plans out tactics in battles.

Mutual Dream Association Group

Uzume's upperclassman, who is a top fashion model and often gives Uzume advice whenever she is down. She is later revealed to be the chairman of the Mutual Dream Association Group who desires Uzume's cards for some reason. She was the original owner of the Uzume's dolls. She formed the MDAG after her doll, Sonnet, was destroyed in a traffic accident, hoping to use the data from Uzume's dolls to rebuild Sonnet using her personal doll, .

A dark-haired spectacled woman, who is initially thought to be the director of the MDAG.

A man who sought out the MDAG to reunite with his ex-girlfriend, using any means necessary to win.

A young boy from the MDAG.

A girl who saw her dolls as her masters as opposed to their servants.

A rugby player who sought out the MDAG so that people would appreciate rugby as a true sport instead of a way to meet girls.

An amateur model who is jealous of Komachi always being ahead of her.

A novice filmmaker who sought out the MDAG to get people to watch his experimental film, that tends to go under-appreciated by the general viewing public.

Other characters

 A mysterious man who watches Uzume very closely. He is secretly one of the teachers at Uzume's school.

 A teacher at Uzume's school who is also Rafflesia's partner.

Uzume's younger sister who befriends Katia, later learning about the other dolls and keeping it a secret.

Uzume and Miko's mother. She was a gambler before, and was very good at poker, initially tricking the Director during their play.

Uzume's classmate, who is often lending her horror DVDs.

Media

Manga
A manga adaptation, illustrated by Anmi and titled , began serialization in volume 20 of Kadokawa Shoten's Newtype Ace magazine sold on April 10, 2013. It was later transferred to Kadokawa Shoten's Comptiq magazine with the September 2013 issue. A spin-off manga, illustrated by Tomiyaki Kagisora and titled , began serialization in the July 2013 issue of Media Factory's Monthly Comic Alive magazine. A third manga, illustrated by Mekimeki and titled Fantasista Doll, began serialization in the July 2013 issue of Kadokawa Shoten's Comp Ace magazine.

Novels
A web novel titled , written by Hiroaki Jinno and illustrated by Anmi, was serialized 14 chapters on the official website of the anime series between April 19 and July 19, 2013. A novel titled , written by Mado Nozaki, was released by Hayakawa Publishing on September 20, 2013. A novel titled Fantasista Doll, written by Akane Mizushima and illustrated by Webisu Daikanyama with the cover illustrated by Hiromi Katō, was published by Fujimi Shobo on October 19, 2013.

Anime
The 12-episode anime series, produced by Hoods Entertainment, aired between July 7 and September 28, 2013 on MBS and was simulcast by Crunchyroll. The series is directed by Hisashi Saitō and is written by Noboru Kimura and Yūko Kakihara, while Gorō Taniguchi is the creative producer. The original concept is credited to the Fantasista Doll Project. The character designs are by the animation director Hiromi Katō, who adapted the anime designs from Anmi's original designs. The music is composed by Yasuharu Takanashi, and the sound director is Yōta Tsuruoka. The anime has been licensed by Sentai Filmworks for streaming and home video release in 2014. Anime Network streams the anime online.

Episode list

Games
A video game titled Fantasista Doll Girls Royale playable on Android and iOS smartphones, developed by Drecom, was released on September 2, 2013. Fantasista Doll will be featured in Bushiroad's Five Qross online trading card game starting November 8, 2013.

Reception
Carl Kimlinger of Anime News Network gave Fantasista Doll an overall B− rating. He was critical of Taniguchi's production team being over-reliant on the magical girl formula throughout the first two-thirds of the series, highlighting the underwritten characters, cornball relationships and lack of "consistent artistry" in the animation as problems. But Kimlinger gave credit to the series for having a "maddening aptitude" to keep viewers interested for the next episode, empathy towards the Dolls' fear of abandonment and wrapping up their ongoing plot points into a heartfelt conclusion, calling it "a surprisingly poignant finish to a previously undistinguished trifle."

References

External links
 
Fantasista Doll Girls Royale official website 

2013 anime television series debuts
2013 manga
Anime with original screenplays
Card games in anime and manga
Hoods Entertainment
Kadokawa Shoten manga
Media Factory manga
Kadokawa Dwango franchises
Science fiction anime and manga
Seinen manga
Sentai Filmworks
Toho Animation
Mainichi Broadcasting System original programming
Inactive online games